is a railway station located in the city of Kitaakita, Akita Prefecture, Japan, operated by the third sector railway operator Akita Nairiku Jūkan Railway.

Lines
Okuani Station is served by the Nariku Line, and is located 49.7 km from the terminus of the line at Takanosu Station.

Station layout
The station consists of one side platform serving a single bi-directional track. The station is unattended.

Adjacent stations

History
Okuani Station opened on April 1, 1989 serving the town of Ani, Akita.

Surrounding area
 Akita Prefectural Rout 308

External links

 Nairiku Railway Station information 

Railway stations in Japan opened in 1989
Railway stations in Akita Prefecture
Kitaakita